is a 1966 Japanese film directed by Masashige Narusawa. It is based on Kafū Nagai`s novel Yojōhan Fusumano Shitabari.

Plot
Fukazawa Shino is a Prostitute in the late Meiji period. Shino was deceived by Tatsukichi and sold. One day Shino came to like a thief (Yoshioka) who came as a customer.

Cast
Fukazawa Shino - Yoshiko Mita
Tasukichi Oshima - Shigeru Tsuyuguchi
Tadashi Yoshioka - Takahiro Tamura
Kimi Yoneyama - Yumiko Nogawa
Kikuzo Segawa - Tatsuo Endō
Taneko Tachibana - Michiyo Kogure
Yasuzō Fukazawa - Eitarō Shindō
Uyu - Eijirō Tōno

References

External links

1966 films
Japanese erotic drama films
1960s Japanese-language films
1960s Japanese films